Allium maowenense is a plant species endemic to the Sichuan region of China. It grows there at elevations of 1100–1500 m.

Allium maowenense has egg-shaped bulbs up to 2 cm in diameter. Scape is up to 60 cm tall. Leaves are hollow, tubular, shorter than the scape. Umbels are spherical, packed with many flowers; tepals white with pink or green midveins.

References

maowenense
Plants described in 1994
Flora of Sichuan
Flora of China
Onions